Thicker than Water is the second album by American punk band H2O, released on October 7, 1997. It was their first of two albums to be released on Epitaph Records.  The album peaked at number 42 on Billboard Top Heatseekers chart in October 1997.

"Friend" is a cover of a song by Marginal Man, a Washington D.C. Dischord Records punk band from the 1980s.

"Everready" and "Thicker than Water" were featured in the video game Street Sk8er.

They did a video for "Everready" with CIV appearing as a news reporter.

Track listing 
All music by H2O. Lyrics by Toby Morse, Todd Morse and Rusty Pistachio, unless otherwise noted.
 "Universal Language" – 0:59
 "Everready" – 2:11
 "Talk Too Much" – 1:30
 "I See It in Us" (Max Capshaw, H2O) – 2:10
 "Sacred Heart" – 2:15
 "Innocent Kids" – 0:45
 "Scarred" – 1:59
 "Go" – 2:24
 "This Time" – 2:00
 "Friend" (Marginal Man) – 1:38
 "A Plus" – 2:22
 "Phone Song" – 2:06
 "Responsible" – 1:35
 "Wake Up" – 1:06
 "Thicker than Water" – 2:06
 "No Fucking Tears" – 2:43
 Track 16 was an unlisted track

Personnel 
 Toby Morse – vocals
 Todd Morse – guitar, vocals
 Rusty Pistachio – guitar, vocals
 Adam Blake – bass
 Todd Friend – drums, vocals
 Recorded June 21–27, 1997 at Brielle Studios, New York City
 Produced by H2O, Larry Buksbaum with Dean Rispler
 Engineered, mastered and mixed (at Sound On Sound, New York City) by Larry Buksbaum
 Pre-production at Loho Studios, New York City

References

External links 
Epitaph Records
Blackout Records

H2O (American band) albums
1997 albums
Epitaph Records albums